Cycnia is a genus of tiger moths in the family Erebidae. The genus was erected by Jacob Hübner in 1818.

Species
 Cycnia collaris (Fitch, 1857)
 Cycnia inopinatus H. Edwards, 1882 – unexpected cycnia
 Cycnia niveola Strand, 1919
 Cycnia oregonensis Stretch, 1874 – Oregon cycnia
 Cycnia tenera Hübner, 1818 – delicate cycnia
 "Cycnia" rubida Walker, 1864
 "Cycnia" sparsigutta Walker, 1864

References

 Crabo, L.; Davis, M.; Hammond, P.; Mustelin, T. & Shepard, J. (2013). "Five new species and three new subspecies of Erebidae and Noctuidae (Insecta, Lepidoptera) from Northwestern North America, with notes on Chytolita Grote (Erebidae) and Hydraecia Guenée (Noctuidae)". Zookeys. 264: 85-123. .
 Lafontaine, J. D. & Schmidt, B. C. (2010). "Annotated check list of the Noctuoidea (Insecta, Lepidoptera) of North America north of Mexico". ZooKeys. 40: 1–239. 
 Lafontaine, J. D. & Schmidt, B. C. (2013). "Additions and corrections to the check list of the Noctuoidea (Insecta: Lepidoptera) of North America north of Mexico". Zookeys. 264: 227–236. .

External links

"Cycnia Inopinatus". a Cycnia research blog.

Phaegopterina
Moth genera